Clifton Brown or Clifton-Brown may refer to:

Full name
 Clifton Brown (boxer), (born 1976) Canadian light-heavyweight Muay Thai kickboxer

Surname
 Douglas Clifton Brown, 1st Viscount Ruffside (1879–1958), British Conservative MP and Speaker
 Geoffrey Clifton-Brown (Bury St Edmunds MP) (1899–1983), British Conservative MP
 Geoffrey Clifton-Brown (born 1953), British Conservative MP

See also
Middle name Clifton, surname Brown
 James Clifton Brown (1841–1917), British Liberal politician
 Howard Clifton Brown (1868–1946), British army officer and Conservative MP
 Francis Clifton Brown (1874–1963), British naval officer